Front Range Ski Club is a private ski racing center, based at Echo Mountain Park. The private ski area is located in Clear Creek County, west of Evergreen, Colorado.  Because they own the entire mountain, Front Range Ski Club has the ability to control the snowmaking, grooming and terrain construction specifically for alpine ski racing.

Description
Front Range Ski Club has the ability to control the snow conditions and terrain specifically to optimize the development of alpine ski racers.  Optimal snow conditions allow for athletes to train on some of the most demanding terrain.  Night skiing allows for athletes to train directly after school to maximize time.
Within the lodges are areas for athletes to change into ski gear, as well as lockers for athlete equipment.  There is an area for warming up before skiing. It is equipped with stationary bicycles, foam roller, medicine balls, and other hardware.  A tuning room is also provided so athletes can easily wax and tune their skis before and after training sessions.

See also
Echo Mountain Park

References

Ski areas and resorts in Colorado